Roy Senior Barraclough  (12 July 1935 – 1 June 2017) was an English comic actor. He was best known for his role as Alec Gilroy, the devious, mournful landlord of the Rovers Return in the long-running British TV soap Coronation Street, and for the double-act Cissie and Ada with comedian Les Dawson.

Career 
Roy Barraclough began his career as a draughtsman, taking time off to work as an entertainer in a holiday camp on the Isle of Wight. Combining his day job with local amateur theatre for several years, he was eventually offered a full-time acting contract by repertory theatre producer Nita Valerie with her company in Huddersfield. Barraclough regularly appeared on stage and at times played piano in the pit, including for comedienne Hylda Baker.

Barraclough later joined the repertory company at Stoke (appearing alongside Ben Kingsley) and then Oldham in 1966, appearing alongside Barbara Knox and Anne Kirkbride, who later both became colleagues on Coronation Street. Whilst at Oldham he made his first TV appearances for Granada Television, including Coronation Street in 1964.

In 1969, he was cast as Harry Everitt in Yorkshire Television's first soap opera Castle Haven with Kathy Staff as his on-screen wife. Although the soap only lasted a year, Barraclough became a regular guest actor on Yorkshire TV shows.

Throughout the 1970s, he formed a partnership with comedian Les Dawson. They played two gossipy old ladies '...of a certain age...': Dawson playing Ada Shufflebotham, and Barraclough playing Cissie Braithwaite, the more 'refined' of the two. Barraclough also had a significant role playing Mr. Cobbledick in the children's TV show Pardon My Genie. He also made guest appearances in the sitcoms The Lovers, Rising Damp and George and Mildred.

Barraclough made occasional appearances in Coronation Street in 1972 and 1975, playing the sleazy Alec Gilroy, theatrical agent to night club singer Rita Littlewood. He returned permanently in 1986 and a marriage to Bet Lynch was included in his character's narrative. After several departures and comebacks, Barraclough finally left Coronation Street for good at the end of 1998.

He was the subject of This Is Your Life in 1987 when he was surprised by Eamonn Andrews.

Barraclough was later to appear in a sitcom, Mother's Ruin (1994), in which he played a bachelor dominated by his belligerent mother (Dora Bryan). He made a guest appearance in Last of the Summer Wine (2005), playing opposite both Bryan and his friend Kathy Staff, and appeared in a variety of TV shows including Casualty (1999), Peak Practice (1994 and 2001) and Funland (2005). In 2005 he appeared in Heartbeat series.

In 2009, he played the vicar in the BBC drama All the Small Things and from 2012 to 2013 he played Maurice in Last Tango in Halifax. In 2016, he played Mr Grainger in a one-off revival episode of Are You Being Served?.

On stage, Barraclough appeared in musicals (The Boy Friend and Gypsy), straight drama (Death of a Salesman) and Christmas shows and pantomimes. He created the role of Santa in the lavish stage musical Santa Claus, which he reprised for several Christmases.

In the 2006 New Year Honours, Barraclough was appointed a Member of the Order of the British Empire (MBE) for services to drama and to charity in the region of North West England.

Death
Barraclough died aged 81, at the Willow Wood Hospice in Ashton-under-Lyne, Greater Manchester, on 1 June 2017, following a short illness.

Partial filmography
The Slipper and the Rose (1976) – Tailor
Car Trouble (1986) – Man with Dog

References

External links
 Roy Barraclough at the British Film Institute
 
 Corrie.net Profile

1935 births
2017 deaths
Actors from Preston, Lancashire
People from Ashton-under-Lyne
English male soap opera actors
English male stage actors
Members of the Order of the British Empire
Male actors from Lancashire